The Book of Southern Tang, or sometimes called Lu's Book of Southern Tang (陸氏南唐書) to distinguish it from the earlier Ma's Book of Southern Tang, was a Chinese historiography book written by Lu You in c. 1184. It has 18 chapters. In 1328 under the Yuan Dynasty, Qi Guang added a phonetic commentary chapter.

It is considered the most authoritative book on Southern Tang history.

References

 
 
 

Chinese history texts
12th-century history books
Song dynasty literature
Southern Tang
History books about the Five Dynasties and Ten Kingdoms
12th-century Chinese books